Bride by Mistake (1944) is an American romantic comedy film directed by Richard Wallace, and starring Alan Marshal and Laraine Day.

The screenplay is by Phoebe Ephron and Henry Ephron, based on a story by Norman Krasna, and is a remake of The Richest Girl in the World (1934).

Plot
Home from the war, Captain Tony Travis (Alan Marshal) eyes an estate in Santa Barbara and wonders what it must be like to be that rich. It is the property of the fabulously wealthy Nora Hunter (Laraine Day), who has secretary and friend Sylvia Lockwood (Marsha Hunt) impersonate her in public. Longtime guardian Jonathan Connors (Edgar Buchanan) protects his ward's privacy zealously. During a ship launching, a press photographer takes Nora's picture, but Connors sees to it that the camera film is ruined.

Sylvia tells Nora that she is quitting so that she can accompany her husband, Phil Vernon (Allyn Joslyn), whose job requires him to move to Washington. Nora decides to marry her fiancé Donald (William Post Jr.) so that Sylvia can be her maid of honor at her wedding. But when Donald returns from military duty, he breaks the news that he has fallen in love with someone else.

Nora hosts a tea, but has Sylvia again pretend to be her. There she meets and takes a liking to Tony, but he is more interested in Sylvia. On hearing him vow that love is more important to him than money, Nora and Sylvia invite him to a weekend at Nora's beach house. Nora helps Tony court Sylvia, so that if he does genuinely love the real Nora, it will not be because of her money. All of her friends tell her she is being foolish, that nobody can resist that much temptation, but she stubbornly persists.

Mix-ups ensue. While tipsy, Sylvia accepts a marriage proposal from Tony. That night, Tony sees Phil sneak to Sylvia's bedroom for a late night hug. The next morning, he punches the overly cheerful Phil over it. Nora tells him that she and Sylvia switched rooms that night. Despite this "confession", he eventually realizes who he really loves, tosses the protesting Nora over his shoulder and carries her away to get married. On their honeymoon night in a cheap motel, Nora finally reveals her true identity. Tony is disgusted and starts to leave, but then sees her for the first time in her nightgown and stays.

Cast
 Alan Marshal as Captain Tony Travis
 Laraine Day as Nora Hunter
 Marsha Hunt as Sylvia Lockwood
 Allyn Joslyn as Phil Vernon
 Edgar Buchanan as Jonathan Connors
 Michael St. Angel as Lieutenant Stephen Corey
 Marc Cramer as Ross
 William Post Jr. as Donald
 Bruce Edwards as Chaplain
 Nancy Gates as Jane Mason
 Slim Summerville as Samuel
 John Miljan as Major Harvey

Production
The film was a remake of The Richest Girl in the World and was originally entitled That Hunter Girl. Bert Gance produced it at RKO.

In December 1943 Hedda Hopper reported that two stars under contract to David O Selznick, Dorothy McGuire and Alan Marshall would work for RKO on a film the following year – possibly The Fair Barbarian or The Flashing Stream. In January 1944 RKO announced they were going to make a marital comedy I Married the Navy written by Emmett Lavery, who was to co produce with Val Lewton. It would be directed by Richard Wallace and star Marshall and McGuire.

In March 1944 RKO announced they had postponed I Married a Navy due to McGuire's refusal to make it. They substituted it on the studio's schedule with That Hunter Girl which was to star Marshall and Laraine Day and be directed by Wallace.

Producer Bert Gance borrowed Henry and Phoebe Ephron from Fox to rewrite the script – not to change the structure but to 'jazz it up". The Ephrons had never written a full script before – Fox hired them off the back of the success of a play they had written – so they asked a secretary who had been the best screenwriter to ever work at the studio; she said Norman Krasna. They got every Krasna script they could and copied how he did his scripts.

When they started writing the star was going to be Dorothy McGuire but she was replaced shortly before production by Laraine Day. Henry Ephron said they "had written the part for McGuire's original and somewhat eccentric style (she hardly ever came through the front door; she always climbed in through the window)" but felt Day was "fine. A good enough actress and quite beautiful."

Laraine Day and Marsha Hunt were borrowed from MGM, Alan Marshall was borrowed from David O. Selznick, Allyn Jolson was borrowed from 20th Century Fox and Edgar Buchanan was borrowed from Columbia. Filming started in March 1944.

The film was called That Hunter Girl but the title was changed to Bride By Mistake in May 1944. Day said she liked making the movie "tremendously. It was the first film designed to make audience laugh for which I had been chosen. I'm hoping this will exert and new and beneficial influence."

Reception
The film made a profit of $600,000.

See also
List of American films of 1944

References

External links
 
 
 
 
Bride by Mistake at Letterbox DVD
Bride by Mistake at BFI

1944 films
1944 romantic comedy films
American romantic comedy films
American black-and-white films
Remakes of American films
Films scored by Roy Webb
Films based on short fiction
Films directed by Richard Wallace
Films set in California
RKO Pictures films
1940s American films